Events in the year 2021 in Namibia.

Incumbents
 President: Hage Geingob
 Vice President: Nangolo Mbumba
 Prime Minister: Saara Kuugongelwa
 Deputy Prime Minister: Netumbo Nandi-Ndaitwah
 Chief Justice: Peter Shivute

Events
Ongoing – COVID-19 pandemic in Namibia

11 January – Test drilling for oil by Vancouver-Canada-based ReconAfrica (formerly Reconnaissance Energy Africa Ltd.) begins in the Kavango Region, Kavango West. The license area is within the Kavango–Zambezi Transfrontier Conservation Area, home to 200,000 people and a number of endangered species, but excludes the protected areas, notably the parks. ReconAfrica has stated that "There will be no damage to the ecosystem from the planned activities."
8 March – Speaking on International Women's Day, First Lady Monica Geingos slams Internet trolls who ″slut shame″ her on social media.

Sports
March – The Namibia Football Premier League is scheduled to begin its first season.

Deaths

References

 
2020s in Namibia
Years of the 21st century in Namibia
Namibia
Namibia